Sangeeta Kumari Singh Deo (born 3 December 1961) is an Indian politician and the wife of the titular Maharaja of Bolangir, an erstwhile princely state located in Odisha. She is the current Member of Parliament in the Lok Sabha from Bolangir of Odisha and member of the BJP. She is a member of the National executive of the party.

Background and family
Sangeeta was born into the minor Rajput nobility of Rajasthan. Her natal family held an estate of five villages of which the largest was Kerote (or Kirot). Her father, Amar Singh, was a younger son and therefore he inherited little, but he entered government service, serving as an officer in the elite IPS. He retired as PR in-charge at the AIIMS, New Delhi. Sangeeta grew up in a middle class milieu and graduated from Delhi university with a BA in political science.

In October 1985, and in a match arranged by their parents in the usual Indian way, Sangeeta was married to Kanakvardhan Singh Deo, son and heir of the Maharaja of Patnagarh-Bolangir, an erstwhile princely state located in Odisha. The couple settled in Delhi and became the parents of a single child, a daughter named Nivritti. In January 2014, again in a match arranged by their families in the usual Indian way, Nivritti was married to Lakshyaraj Singh, only son and heir of Shriji Arvind Singh of Mewar.

Career
Kanakvardhan's father and grandfather had both been active and successful politicians. His grandfather, Maharaja Rajendra Narayan Singh Deo, who had enjoyed absolute ruling power within his state during the period 1933–47, had adjusted very well to democracy after independence, and excelled in politics to the extent of serving as Chief Minister of Orissa during the period 1967-71 as a member of the Swatantra party. Kanakvardhan's father has also been a member of parliament twice. Inevitably, Kanakvardhan was drawn to politics and served for four terms as member for Patnagarh in the Odisha state assembly. The family felt the need to ensure that the national parliamentary seat covering their former kingdom should also be under their control. Kanakvardhan therefore made Sangeeta a member of his party, the Bharatiya Janata Party, and arranged for her to contest parliamentary elections. Sangeeta won the Bolangir Lok Sabha seat in 1998, 1999 and 2004 and thus was a member of the 12th, 13th and 14th Lok Sabhas. She lost the polls in 2009 and again in 2014 to a member of her own family, her husband's first cousin, Kalikesh Singh Deo, who is a prominent member of the Biju Janata Dal. Sangeeta took third position in the 2009 elections and second place in 2014.

External links
 Members of Fourteenth Lok Sabha - Parliament of India website
 Nivritti Kumari Singh Deo official Facebook

 

1961 births
Living people
India MPs 1998–1999
India MPs 1999–2004
India MPs 2004–2009
India MPs 2019–present
Bharatiya Janata Party politicians from Odisha
Women in Odisha politics
Lok Sabha members from Odisha
State cabinet ministers of Odisha
National Democratic Alliance candidates in the 2014 Indian general election
People from Balangir
21st-century Indian women politicians
21st-century Indian politicians
20th-century Indian women politicians
20th-century Indian politicians
Women state cabinet ministers of India
Women members of the Lok Sabha